The 1955 season was Wisła Krakóws 47th year as a club. Wisła was under the name of Gwardia Kraków until 10 September 1955.

Friendlies

Ekstraklasa

Polish Cup

Squad, appearances and goals

|-
|}

Goalscorers

External links
1955 Wisła Kraków season at historiawisly.pl
Wisła in 1955 Ekstraklasa

Wisła Kraków seasons
Association football clubs 1955 season
Wisla